Zhovkva is a city in Lviv Raion, Lviv Oblast (region) of western Ukraine. Zhovkva hosts the administration of Zhovkva urban hromada, one of the hromadas of Ukraine.

History

A village named Winniki was mentioned at the site in 1368 and was part of the Kingdom of Poland under the Piast dynasty. The town was founded in 1597 as a private fortified town and named Żółkiew after its founder, one of the most accomplished military commanders in Polish history, hetman Stanisław Żółkiewski. Like Zamość, which was founded by Żółkiewski's mentor Jan Zamoyski, Żółkiew was built on an ideal Renaissance city plan. Due to its strategic location at the intersection of important trade routes, the town prospered. In 1603 it was granted town rights by King Sigismund III Vasa. From its earliest days, the population was a mix of Poles, Armenians, Ukrainians, and Jews. Great Jewish scholars from Zhovkva include Ariah Judah Leib Sirkin and Betzalel HaLevi of Zhovkva.

In the 17th century, it became the royal residence for King John III Sobieski of Poland, and a hub of religious life, arts and commerce. In 1676, King of France, Louis XIV, visited Żółkiew and awarded the Polish King with the Order of the Holy Spirit. The city was the site of celebrations after the victorious Battle of Vienna of 1683, and in 1684 the Polish King was awarded there with papal gifts, sent by Pope Innocent XI.

As a private town of Poland, Żółkiew was the property of the Żółkiewski, Daniłowicz, Sobieski and Radziwiłł families. During this period, most of the city's landmarks were built, including the Zhovkva Castle and St. Lawrence's Church, both founded by Stanisław Żółkiewski, the Dominican church, founded by Teofila Sobieska, the fortress-like Great Synagogue, co-financed by King John III Sobieski, and the foundations of the king's sons: the Saint Lazarus church founded by prince James Louis Sobieski and the Holy Trinity Church, founded by prince Konstanty Władysław Sobieski.

Late modern era 

From the First Partition of Poland in 1772 until 1918, the town (named Żółkiew) was part of the Austrian monarchy (Austrian part of Austro-Hungary after the compromise of 1867), head of the district with the same name, one of the 78 Bezirkshauptmannschaften in Austrian Galicia province (Crown land)
in 1900.

The West Ukrainian People's Republic, established on November 1, 1918, included the whole Zhovkva povit (county). The town came under Polish control in May 1919, seven months after the re-establishment of independent Poland, confirmed by the Paris Peace Conference in June 1919 and the Peace of Riga in 1921. It was a county (powiat) seat located in the Lwów Voivodeship. In the interwar period the 6th Cavalry Regiment of the Polish Army, named after hetman Stanisław Żółkiewski, was stationed in the town.

World War II and recent times 
In 1939, following the Soviet invasion of Poland, Żółkiew, together with the rest of Poland's Kresy Wschodnie, was occupied by the Soviet Union. The Soviets destroyed the statue of King John III Sobieski, located in front of the town hall and the statue of the city founder hetman Stanisław Żółkiewski, located in the park. In June 1941, the Soviets executed 34 people, Ukrainians and Poles, in a prison organized in the former Żółkiewski castle, as part of the NKVD prisoner massacres. A few people managed to escape the massacre, including a German prisoner of war.

From 1941 to 1944 Zhovkva was occupied by Germany. At the beginning of the occupation, Jews numbered around 4500 and were almost half the town's population.  Less than 100 Jews survived the Holocaust. In 1942, Germans, assisted by Ukrainian police, deported 3,200 Jews to the Belzec extermination camp. Many others were killed by Germans, assisted by Ukrainian police, in the vicinity of the city, and the rest were taken to the Janowska concentration camp. The synagogue was blown up by the Nazis in 1941, leaving only the outside walls. In 2000, the building was declared one of the world's most endangered sites by the World Monuments Fund. A restoration campaign began in 2001, supported by WMF's Jewish Heritage Program and other sources, which is ongoing.

From July 1944 it was occupied by the Soviets again and in 1945 it was annexed by the Soviet Union. It became a part of Ukrainian Soviet Socialist Republic in 1944. As a result of the actions of both the Ukrainian nationalists of the UPA and the Soviets, almost all Poles left the city in 1944–1946. In 1951 the town was renamed Nesterov after the World War I aviator Pyotr Nesterov who became the first to perform aerial ramming in the history of aviation near Zhovkva in 1914. The name Zhovkva, which is the Ukrainian version of the historic Polish name, was restored in 1992, after Ukraine became independent of the Soviet Union.

Until 18 July 2020, Zhovkva was the administrative center of Zhovkva Raion. The raion was abolished in July 2020 as part of the administrative reform of Ukraine, which reduced the number of raions of Lviv Oblast to seven. The area of Zhovkva Raion was merged into Lviv Raion.

Historical sites 

The Collegiate Church of St. Lawrence, a domed church from the 17th century founded by Stanisław Żółkiewski and built by a group of Italian architects, was turned into a warehouse under Soviet rule. After Ukraine declared independence in the early 1990s, the church was restored. The church contains the sarcophagus of the city's founder Stanisław Żółkiewski.

The town center of Zhovkva was declared a heritage site in 1994, and restoration work is now under way. Zhovkva Castle, the town's oldest and largest building, former residence of hetman Stanisław Żółkiewski and King John III Sobieski, is being converted into a culture and conference hall.

The wooden Holy Trinity Church built in 1720 by Polish prince Konstanty Władysław Sobieski, was listed in 2013 as a World Heritage Site by UNESCO, as a part of the composite site Wooden tserkvas of the Carpathian region in Poland and Ukraine.

Relics of Saint Parthenius, 3rd-century Christian martyr from Rome were moved to Zhovkva in 1784. They are kept at the local Church of Holy Heart of Jesus, run by Ukrainian Greek-Catholic monks of the Basilian order.

A Renaissance architecture fortified synagogue, built between 1692 and 1698, and co-financed by Polish King John III Sobieski, is located in the town.

Gas-free city
In 2017 Zhovkva became the first city of Ukraine that did not use gas in central heating system.

European Union financed Zhovkva project. It allowed to fully eliminate gas and use wood instead.

Notable residents
 Aaron Margalita, Jewish scholar who converted to Christianity
 Aaron Selig ben Moses of Zolkiev, Jewish scholar
 Aaron of Trebowla, Jewish scholar
 Ivan Rutkovych, Ukrainian iconographer
 Ivan Krypiakevych, Ukrainian historian, academician
 Zbigniew Burzyński, Polish balloonist and constructor of balloons, pioneer of Polish balloons
 Clara Kramer, Holocaust survivor
 Salcia Landmann, researcher of Yiddish culture
 Jakub Ludwik Sobieski, Polish prince, son of King John III Sobieski
 Jakub Sobieski, Polish parliamentarian, military leader and father of King John III Sobieski
 Włodzimierz Puchalski, Polish photographer and film director
 Stanisław Żółkiewski, Polish nobleman and military commander, founder of the town
 Włodzimierz Stożek, Polish mathematician of the Lwów School of Mathematics
 Hillel ben Naphtali Zevi, Lithuanian rabbi
 Nachman Krochmal, Jewish philosopher
 Jacob ben Wolf Kranz, maggid
 Zalman Schachter-Shalomi, one of the founders of the Jewish Renewal movement and an innovator in ecumenical dialogue
 Hersch Lauterpacht, member of the United Nations' International Law Commission
 Lubomyr Romankiw, Ukrainian computer scientist

See also
Aaron of Cardena

References

External links

 Żółkiew (Zhovkva) in the Geographical Dictionary of the Kingdom of Poland (1895)
 castles.com.ua - Zhovkva
 ua.vlasenko.net - Pictures of Zhovkva

 
Cities in Lviv Oblast
Lwów Voivodeship
Ruthenian Voivodeship
Populated places established in 1597
Cities of district significance in Ukraine
1590s establishments in the Polish–Lithuanian Commonwealth
Shtetls
Holocaust locations in Ukraine